Welcome to the Club is a 1971 American comedy film directed by Walter Shenson and starring Brian Foley, Jack Warden, Andy Jarrell, Kevin O'Connor, Francesca Tu, and David Toguri. It is based on the 1966 novel of the same name by Clement Biddle Wood. The film was released by Columbia Pictures in September 1971.

Plot

Cast
Brian Foley as Lt. Andrew Oxblood
Jack Warden as Gen. Strapp
Andy Jarrell as Robert E. Lee Fairfax
Kevin O'Connor as Harrison W. Morve
Francesca Tu as Hogan
David Toguri as Hideki Ikada
Al Mancini as Pvt. Marcantonio
Art Wallace as Col. Buonocuore
Marsha A. Hunt as Leah Wheat
Joyce Wilford as Shawna O'Shay
Lon Satton as Marshall Bowles
Christopher Malcolm as Pvt. Henry Hoe
John Dunn-Hill as Pvt. O'Malley
Lee Meredith as Betsy Wholecloth
Louis Quinn as Capt. Sigmus
Lionel Murton as Col. Ames
Jeanne Darville as Mrs. Oxblood
Anisha as Chita
Claus Ersbak as Schultz
Norman Oliver as Tom
Mary Petryshyn as Ann (as Eva Marie Petryshen)

References

External links

1971 comedy films
American comedy films
1971 films
Columbia Pictures films
Films based on American novels
Films set in 1945
Films set in Hiroshima
Japan in non-Japanese culture
Films scored by Ken Thorne
1970s English-language films
1970s American films